The Eurovision Song Contest 2002 was the 47th edition of the Eurovision Song Contest. Organised by the European Broadcasting Union (EBU) and host broadcaster Eesti Televisioon (ETV), the contest was held at the Saku Suurhall on 25 May 2002. The contest was presented by Estonian opera singer Annely Peebo and actor Marko Matvere. It was the first Eurovision Song Contest held in one of the former Soviet republics.

Twenty-four countries participated in the contest. It was the first (and only) time Ireland and Norway were relegated from the contest.  was also set to sit out this year, but when  announced their non-participation, due to internal problems at its broadcaster, it left a spot open for Latvia to take, as the country had finished higher the year before than any of the other relegated countries. This would go on to be very fortunate for the country as Latvia ended up winning the contest with the song "I Wanna", performed by Marie N who wrote it with Marats Samauskis. Malta, United Kingdom, Estonia and France rounded out the top five. Malta achieved their best result in their Eurovision history, coming second. Further down the table, Denmark finished twenty-fourth and last, their worst result up until that point, despite having been declared one of the favourites to win the competition beforehand.

Location 

Tallinn is the capital and largest city of Estonia. Founded in 1248 but the earliest human settlements date back to 3000 years BC, making it one of the oldest capital cities of Northern Europe. Due to its important strategic location the city soon became a major trade hub, especially between the 14th to 16th century when it grew to be a key centre of commerce within the Hanseatic League. Tallinn's Old Town is one of the best preserved and intact medieval cities in Europe and is listed as a UNESCO World Heritage Site.

Venue 
Early in the proceedings, media outlets had begun speculating whether Estonian broadcaster ETV would be able to host the contest, citing a lack of a suitable venue and budgetary concerns. Due to this, Maltese broadcaster PBS and Dutch broadcaster NOS both expressed interest in hosting in the event in respective countries instead of Estonia. However, worries were put to rest when a combination of fundraising activities and the Estonian Government enabled them to host the event.

On 19 June 2001, it was announced that Estonia would still host the 2002 contest. The Saku Suurhall was ultimately chosen as the venue for the contest. It is the largest indoor arena in Estonia, built in 2001 and holds up to 10,000 people. It is named after the Estonian brewery and soft drink company Saku.

Format

Slogan 
For the first time, a slogan (or theme) was implemented. This year's theme was called 'A Modern Fairytale', which was evident in the postcards shown between the songs, which showed classic fairytales ending in modern Estonian situations.

Postcards 
The postcards continued with the opening theme of "A Modern Fairytale" taking well known fairy tales and translating them into Estonian life through short films, with a moral at the end of each one of them. The various fairy tales were as following, listed in appearance order:

 Aladdin; "Anything can happen in Estonian clubs..."
 The Ugly Duckling; "Young Estonians flying high"
 The Three Bears; "No parking spaces... theatres everywhere"
 Hansel and Gretel; "Countless Internet connections"
 Frankenstein; "Tartu University - one of the oldest in Europe"
 The Three Brothers; "Nation of champions"
 The Goldfish; "Freedom"
 Sleeping Beauty; "Old Town... new experiences"
 The Missing Princess; "Fall in love with Estonian folk-dance"
 Thumbelina; "Famous Estonian conductors"
 Cinderella; "Young Estonian fashion"
  The Magic Carpet; "Everything at the press of a button"
 The Three Little Pigs; "Sauna - extreme heat from Estonia"
 The Little Mermaid; "In every port of the world you can find an Estonian sailor." (an Ernest Hemingway quotation)
 The Frog Prince; "10,000 years of untouched nature"
 Bluebeard; "Football... beer... castles"
 The Princess Who Would Not Smile; "Estonia - it's a small world"
 Pinocchio; "Living Estonian handicraft" 
 Ali Baba and the Forty Thieves; "Forests - Estonian treasure"
 Beauty and the Beast; "Beaches of golden sand"
 The Pied Piper; "Endless Estonian hospitality"
 Snow White; "So many beautiful women"
 Little Red Riding Hood; "Homemade bread... for meateaters"
 Puss in Boots; "White nights... shooting stars"

Participating countries 
A total of 24 countries competed in the 2002 contest, which included the top 17 countries from the previous year's contest, alongside the seven returning countries which had been relegated from competing in the 2001 contest. These countries replaced the bottom 6 countries from the 2001 contest, which were relegated from taking part in this year's contest.

The total participants had originally been 22, but when the European Broadcasting Union (EBU) increased their participation number for the contest to 24 this granted Israel and Portugal the opportunity to enter. Portugal declined to enter the contest due to internal problems in the Portuguese broadcaster RTP. This allowed Latvia (who went on to win the contest) to enter.

Draw for the running order took place on 9 November 2001.

Returning artists

Participants and results

Detailed voting results 

Half of the participating countries organized a televote where the top 10 songs received the points, 1, 2, 3, 4, 5, 6, 7, 8, 10 and 12, but Macedonia, Romania, Russia, Turkey and Bosnia and Herzegovina used juries, while Cyprus, Greece, Spain, Croatia, Finland, Malta, Slovenia and Lithuania used a 50-50 mix of both televoting and jury votes.

In the EBU's rules for the 2002 contest, it was stated; In the televoting, households shall not be permitted to vote more than three times.
At this contest (and the following one) the broadcaster decided to reverse the song recaps - starting instead with the last performed song (24) and finishing with the first performed song (1).
This was used as it had become apparent that the public vote favoured songs in the later part of the running order in comparison to the songs nearer to the start - particularly in the preceding 2001 contest

12 points 
Below is a summary of all 12 points in the final:

Spokespersons 

 Melani Steliou
 Colin Berry
 
 
 Anne Igartiburu
 Duško Ćurlić
 Arina Sharapova
 Ilomai Küttim "Elektra"
 Biljana Debarlieva
 
 Diana Jörg
 Kristin Kaspersen
 Marion Rung
 Signe Svendsen
 Segmedina Srna
 
 Marie Myriam
 Axel Bulthaupt
 Meltem Ersan Yazgan
 Yvette Portelli
 Leonard Miron
 Nuša Derenda
 
 Loreta Tarozaitė

Broadcasts 

Each participating broadcaster was required to relay live and in full the contest via television. Non-participating EBU member broadcasters were also able to relay the contest as "passive participants"; any passive countries wishing to participate in the following year's event were also required to provide a live broadcast of the contest or a deferred broadcast within 24 hours. Broadcasters were able to send commentators to provide coverage of the contest in their own native language and to relay information about the artists and songs to their viewers. Known details on the broadcasts in each country, including the specific broadcasting stations and commentators, are shown in the tables below.

Incidents

Commentator remarks 
Controversy erupted during the competition over remarks by commentators on Swedish and Belgian TV, both of whom told the audience not to vote for the Israeli entry "Light a candle" by Sarit Hadad. The song received zero points from the Swedish audience but earned two from the Belgians, finishing 12th overall.

Allegation of vote swapping 
This year saw allegations that the juries in certain countries were guilty of swapping votes among each other. According to the Norwegian newspaper Dagbladet, The French Head of Delegation allegedly said that members of the Cypriot delegation had approached him to swap votes. In addition to Cyprus, allegations were also made toward Greece, Russia, Macedonia, Malta and Romania.

Other awards

Marcel Bezençon Awards 

For the first time, the Marcel Bezençon Awards, organised by Sweden's then-Head of Delegation and 1992 representative Christer Björkman, and 1984 winner Richard Herrey, honoured songs in the contest. The awards are divided into three categories: the Artistic Award, the Fan Award, and the Press Award. The Fan Award was decided by the combined votes from members of OGAE, an organisation consisting of a network of over 40 Eurovision Song Contest fan clubs across Europe and beyond.

Official album

Eurovision Song Contest: Tallinn 2002 (also known as Eurovision Song Contest: Estonia 2002) was the official compilation album of the 2002 contest, put together by the European Broadcasting Union and released by Ariola Records on 18 May 2002. The album featured all 24 songs that entered in the 2002 contest.

Charts

Notes

References

External links

 
2002
Music festivals in Estonia
2002 in Estonia
2002 song contests
2000s in Tallinn
Culture in Tallinn
May 2002 events in Europe
Events in Tallinn
Music in Tallinn